Arthur Jimerson (born May 12, 1968, in Erie, Pennsylvania) is a former linebacker for the former Los Angeles Raiders of the National Football League. He attended elementary and middle school in Norfolk, Virginia.  He attended Deep Creek High School in Chesapeake, Virginia where he played high school football, basketball, and track.  He was chosen as the Virginian Pilot Male Athlete of the Year.  He attended Norfolk State University on a football scholarship before being drafted the #4 pick of the 8th round in the 1990 NFL Draft by the then Los Angeles Raiders.

After a knee injury ended his career he returned to Norfolk State University in Norfolk, Virginia, and earned a bachelor's degree in economics and a master's degree in Urban Studies.  He is currently Dean of Students at Durham Nativity School in Durham, North Carolina.  He is remarried now and has four children from a previous marriage.

He currently resides in Butner, North Carolina

References

Los Angeles Raiders players
Living people
Norfolk State Spartans football players
1968 births
American football linebackers